Jaua-Sarisariñama National Park (Spanish: Parque nacional Jaua-Sarisariñama) was located in the Guayana Highlands, within Bolívar State of southeastern Venezuela.  It was established in 1978. It has been subsumed within Caura National Park, which was established in 2017.

The landscape of the park is notable for three sandstone tepuis, Jaua, Sarisariñama and Guanacoco. The top of Sarisariñama is forested and has sinkholes.

Ecology
The park is an Important Bird Area.  Resident bird species include Tepui parrotlet (Nannopsittaca panychlora).

Amphibians of interest include three species of stefania (carrying frogs) which appear to be endemic to the park:
 Stefania oculosa (Spanish: Rana Stefania De Ojos Grandes)
 Stefania percristata
 Stefania riae

References

National parks of Venezuela
Guayana Highlands
Geography of Bolívar (state)
Important Bird Areas of Venezuela
Protected areas established in 1978
1978 establishments in Venezuela
Tourist attractions in Bolívar (state)